So Fresh: The Hits of Spring 2002 is a compilation of songs that were popular in Australia at the time of release. It was released on 16 September 2002.

Track listing
 Holly Valance – "Kiss Kiss" (Wise Buddah Mix) (3:25)
 Sophie Ellis-Bextor – "Get Over You" (3:14)
 Enrique Iglesias – "Escape" (3:28)
 Nelly – "Hot in Herre" (3:49)
 Shakaya – "Sublime" (3:18)
 DJ Sammy and Yanou featuring Do – "Heaven" (S'n'Y Mix) (3:54)
 Angie Stone – "Wish I Didn't Miss You" (4:19)
 Ashanti – "Foolish" (3:51)
 Christina Milian – "When You Look at Me" (3:43)
 Pink – "Don't Let Me Get Me" (3:31)
 Destiny's Child – "Nasty Girl" (Maurice's Nu Soul Remix) (3:59)
 Jennifer Lopez featuring Nas – "I'm Gonna Be Alright" (Trackmasters Remix) (2:53)
 Will Smith introducing Trā-Knox – "Black Suits Comin' (Nod Ya Head)" (3:55)
 Paulina Rubio – "Don't Say Goodbye" (3:39)
 Selwyn – "Rich Girl" (Rudy Mix) (3:28)
 Charlton Hill – "2's Company" (3:53)
 Bachelor Girl – "I'm Just a Girl" (3:56)
 Tim Deluxe – "It Just Won't Do" (3:19)
 DJ Ötzi – "Hey Baby" (3:37)
 Tenacious D – "Tribute" (3:56)

Charts

References

So Fresh albums
2002 compilation albums
2002 in Australian music